Poppy (Italian: Lo sai che i papaveri) is a 1952 Italian comedy film by Vittorio Metz and Marcello Marchesi and starring Walter Chiari, Anna Maria Ferrero and Carlo Campanini. It was sot at the Ponti-De Laurentis Studios in Rome. The film's sets were designed by the art director Alberto Boccianti.

Synopsis
Unknowingly, respectable schoolteacher Gualtiero leads a double life as Walter who frequents nightclubs every night. Whereas Gualtiero is engaged to a fellow teacher Anna, Walter is a carousing womaniser. Pierina, one of his students who has a crush on him, discovers about his nocturnal visits and seeks him out. They enjoy a romance, but by day he remembers nothing about it. Eventually when confronted, he visits a psychiatrist who reveals he has a duel personality with strong contrasting traits inherited from each of his parents.

Cast
 Walter Chiari as Gualtiero/Walter
 Anna Maria Ferrero as  Pierina Zacchi
 Carlo Campanini as   Padre di Pierina
 Luisa Rossi as Anna Butti
 Franca Rame as  Silvana
 Raimondo Vianello as  lo psicoanalista 
 Lauro Gazzolo as  il preside
 Juan Carlos Lamas as Lamas 
 Galeazzo Benti as 	Viveur del night
 Dorian Gray as La guardarobiera
 Marcella Rovena as Governanta casa Zacchi
 Belle Tildy as 	Jeanette D'Aubry
 Maria Pia Trepaoli as 	Cartomante
 Guglielmo Barnabò as 	Medico
 Ennio Girolami as Marocchi 
 Bruno Smith as 	Direttore del night 'I tarocchi'
 Guglielmo Inglese as  il bidello Elia
 Mario De Simone as Compoagna del scuola
 Franco Pastorino as 	Rinaldo
 Mimmo Poli as 'Sfilatino'
 Furio Meniconi as Spacciatore di droga

References

Bibliography
 Brunetta, Gian Piero. The History of Italian Cinema: A Guide to Italian Film from Its Origins to the Twenty-first Century.  Princeton University Press, 2009.

External links
 

1952 films
1950s Italian-language films
Italian comedy films
1952 comedy films
Italian black-and-white films
1950s Italian films
Films directed by Vittorio Metz
Films directed by Marcello Marchesi